Euxesta nigricans is a species of ulidiid or picture-winged fly in the genus Euxesta of the family Ulidiidae. It was described by Frederik Maurits van der Wulp in 1899. It can be found in Guerrero, Mexico.

References

nigricans
Insects described in 1899
Taxa named by Frederik Maurits van der Wulp